William Michael Heinen Jr. (born January 17, 1967) is an American professional golfer who has played on the PGA Tour and the Nationwide Tour.

Heinen was born in Rayne, Louisiana and raised in Fenton, Louisiana. He attended the University of Louisiana at Lafayette from 1985–1989, and was a two-time All-American member of the golf team. He turned pro in 1989.

Throughout his career, Heinen has split his playing time in relatively equal amounts between the PGA Tour and the Nationwide Tour. In 1994, he won the Shell Houston Open in just his 10th start on the PGA Tour. He lives in Lake Charles, Louisiana with his wife and three children.

Professional wins (1)

PGA Tour wins (1)

PGA Tour playoff record (0–1)

Playoff record
Buy.com Tour playoff record (0–2)

Results in major championships

Note: Heinen never played in The Open Championship.

CUT = missed the half-way cut

See also
1993 PGA Tour Qualifying School graduates
2002 PGA Tour Qualifying School graduates

References

External links

American male golfers
Louisiana Ragin' Cajuns men's golfers
PGA Tour golfers
Golfers from Louisiana
People from Rayne, Louisiana
Sportspeople from Lake Charles, Louisiana
1967 births
Living people